Steppes is a rural locality in the local government area of Central Highlands in the Central region of Tasmania. The 2016 census determined a population of nil for the state suburb of Steppes.

History
Steppes is a confirmed suburb/locality.

Geography
The Shannon River forms most of the western boundary.

Road infrastructure
The A5 route (Highland Lakes Road) passes through from south to north. Route B51 (Poatina Road) starts at an intersection with A5 and exits to the north. Route C178 (Waddamana Road) starts at an intersection with A5 and runs south-west before exiting. Route C527 (Interlaken Road) starts at an intersection with A5 and runs south-east before exiting.

References

Localities of Central Highlands Council
Towns in Tasmania